Williamsonia is a genus of small dragonflies in the family Corduliidae. They are commonly known as boghaunters. Unlike other genera of emerald dragonflies, they have dark eyes and nonmetallic bodies.

The genus consists of only two living species:
Williamsonia fletcheri  – ebony boghaunter
Williamsonia lintneri  – ringed boghaunter

References 

Corduliidae
Anisoptera genera